Sodium-dependent phosphate transport protein 2B (NaPi2b) is a protein that in humans is encoded by the SLC34A2 gene.

Clinical significance
Sodium-dependent phosphate transport protein 2b (NaPi2b) is a tumor-associated antigen.

See also
 Solute carrier family
 Pulmonary alveolar microlithiasis

References

Further reading

Solute carrier family